Drivecenter Arena, previously known as Skellefteå Drive Center, is a motorsport race track in Fällfors (Västerbotten County), Sweden. The circuit opened in 2019 having been converted from a retired Swedish Air Force base, Fällfors Air Base .

History
Fällfors Air Base had been a modernised Swedish Air Force base with three runways and a reinforced section of adjoining highway to act as a spare runway. The base was built in the 1950s. The base operated  Saab 29 Tunnan, Saab 32 Lansen, Saab 35 Draken and Saab 37 Viggen fighter-bombers over the years. One of its features was a mountain hangar built in rock in the dispersal area to the north of the runways. The base closed in 2006. The base was sold off and the Skellefteå Drive Center opened in 2008 and operated as a driver training and vehicle testing facility, with the former runways used occasionally for drag racing. After an ownership change in 2017 the anticipated motor racing circuit was completed and the held their first race on 14 June 2019.

At the opening Midnattsolsloppet meeting the circuit hosted both domestic and international motor racing with TCR Scandinavia, Formula Nordic, both the Swedish and North European Zone championships, Porsche Carrera Cup Scandinavia and GT4 Scandinavia racing series.

Lap records 

The official race lap records at the Drivecenter Arena are listed as:

References

External links
 Official site 

Motorsport venues in Sweden
Defunct airports in Sweden